Beyond the Darklands is a New Zealand true crime television series that airs on TVNZ's TV One.  It is narrated and presented by clinical psychologist Nigel Latta, with each episode focusing on a certain criminal (usually a murderer or team of murderers). The show has run for five seasons. Inspiration for the series came from Latta's 2003 book Into the Darklands: Unveiling the Predators Among Us, which dealt with Latta's work as a forensic psychologist.

An Australian series of the same name based on the New Zealand show has been running since 2009. The TVNZ series was previously shown in Australia on the ci channel on Foxtel.

Episodes

References

External links
TVNZ Beyond the Darklands page

2008 New Zealand television series debuts
2010s New Zealand television series
New Zealand documentary television series
Television shows funded by NZ on Air
Television series by Screentime